The Allegheny Portage Railroad was the first railroad constructed through the Allegheny Mountains in central Pennsylvania. It operated from 1834 to 1854 as the first transportation infrastructure through the gaps of the Allegheny that connected the midwest to the eastern seaboard across the barrier range of the Allegheny Front. Today, the remains of the railroad are preserved within the Allegheny Portage Railroad National Historic Site operated by the National Park Service.

The railroad was authorized as part of the Main Line of Public Works legislation in 1824. It had five inclines on either side of the drainage divide running athwart the ridge line from Blair Gap through along the kinked saddle at the summit into Cresson, Pennsylvania. The endpoints connected to the Canal at Johnstown on the west through the relative flats to Hollidaysburg on the east. The Railroad utilized cleverly designed wheeled barges to ride a narrow-gauge rail track with steam-powered stationary engines lifting the vehicles. The roadbed of the railroad did not incline monotonically upwards, but rose in relatively long, saw-toothed stretches of slightly-sloped flat terrain suitable to animal powered towing, alternating with steep cable railway inclined planes using static steam engine powered windlasses, similar to mechanisms of modern ski lifts.

Except for peak moments of severe storms, it was an all-weather, all-seasons operation. Along with the rest of the Main Works, it cut transport time from Philadelphia to the Ohio River from weeks to just 3–5 days. Considered a technological marvel in its day, it played a critical role in opening the interior of the United States beyond the Appalachian Mountains to settlement and commerce. It included the first railroad tunnel in the United States, the Staple Bend Tunnel, and its inauguration was marked with great fanfare.

History

Construction of the Old Portage Railroad from Hollidaysburg to Johnstown, thirty six miles long, began in 1831 and took three years to complete. The project was financed by the Commonwealth of Pennsylvania as a means to compete with the Erie Canal in New York and the Chesapeake and Ohio Canal and Baltimore and Ohio Railroad in Maryland. The work was done largely through private contractors. The railroad utilized eleven grade lines and ten cable inclined planes, five on either side of the summit of the Allegheny Ridge, to carry loaded canal boats on flatbed railroad cars. Trains of two-three cars were pulled on grade lines by mules. On inclined planes, stationary steam engines pulled up and lowered down cars by hemp ropes switching to wire ropes in 1842.

A typical ride took 4 days instead of the former 23-day horse-wagon journey. The Old Portage Railroad was in operation for twenty years being considered "the wonder of America." Charles Dickens wrote a contemporary account of travel on the railroad in Chapter 10 of his American Notes. Quoted at length in the Pennsylvania guide, Dickens "described travel on the Portage in 1842," describing aspects of the Portage Railroad's immediate social and geographic context, as well as mechanical strategies used by the Railroad for coping with the steep grades encountered on the route :

In the 1850s, the Main Line of Public Works and its portage railroad was rendered obsolete by the advance of railway technology and railroad engineering. Early in 1846 the Legislature chartered the Pennsylvania Railroad (PRR) to cross the entire state in response to plans by the Baltimore and Ohio Railroad to reach the Ohio Valley through Virginia. In December 1852 trains started to run between Philadelphia and Pittsburgh shortening the travel time from 4 days to 13 hours.

Construction on the New Portage Railroad, a 40-mile realignment to cross the Allegheny Ridge bypassing inclines, started in 1851 and cost $2.14 million. The PRR raised sufficient investment and had enough quick success that they bought the existing Portage railroad and other parts of the Main Line of Public Works from the state on July 31, 1857. The PRR abandoned most of the line and used the rest as local branches; "anything of value was either sold or stripped from the Allegheny Portage Railroad."

Nearly half a century later, the graded roadbeds of the descending section east of the Gallitzin Tunnel were re-railed with standard gauge freight tracks. The line reopened as a freight bypass line in 1904.

Pennsylvania Railroad successor Conrail abandoned this line to Hollidaysburg and most of the branch trackage along the Juniata River in 1981 and removed the rails.

The Allegheny Portage Railroad was designated as a National Historic Civil Engineering Landmark by the American Society of Civil Engineers in 1987.

National Historic Site

The park service operates a visitor center with interpretive exhibits near the old line. Nearby is the Samuel Lemon House, a tavern located alongside the railroad near Cresson that was a popular stop for railroad passengers; it has been converted into a historical museum by the National Park Service. The NPS also maintains a length of reconstructed track, an engine house with exhibits, a picnic area, and hiking trails.

A skew arch bridge, a masterwork of cut stone construction, is another feature of the site near the Lemon House. It was the only bridge on the line that was built to carry a road.

Gallery

See also

Bridge in Portage Township
Horseshoe Curve (Pennsylvania)
Muleshoe Curve
Kittanning Path
Lilly Bridge
Morris Canal

References

Bibliography

External links

National Park Service: Allegheny Portage Railroad National Historic Site
Allegheny Portage Railroad: Developing Transportation Technology
Map of the Route
Allegheny Portage Railroad: Developing Transportation Technology, a National Park Service Teaching with Historic Places (TwHP) lesson plan
 
 American Society of Civil Engineers - National Historic Civil Engineering Landmark

National Historic Sites in Pennsylvania
Defunct Pennsylvania railroads
Pennsylvania Railroad Through-freight Lines
Predecessors of the Pennsylvania Railroad
Portages in the United States
National Historic Landmarks in Pennsylvania
Railroad museums in Pennsylvania
Railway companies established in 1831
Railway companies disestablished in 1857
Defunct funicular railways in the United States
Historic Civil Engineering Landmarks
Museums in Cambria County, Pennsylvania
Parks in Blair County, Pennsylvania
Tourist attractions in Blair County, Pennsylvania
Tourist attractions in Cambria County, Pennsylvania
Historic American Buildings Survey in Pennsylvania
Historic American Engineering Record in Pennsylvania
Railroad-related National Historic Landmarks
Altoona, Pennsylvania
Cableways on the National Register of Historic Places
Rail infrastructure on the National Register of Historic Places in Pennsylvania
National Register of Historic Places in Blair County, Pennsylvania
1831 establishments in Pennsylvania
1857 disestablishments in Pennsylvania
American companies established in 1831
Protected areas of Blair County, Pennsylvania
Protected areas of Cambria County, Pennsylvania
American companies disestablished in 1857